Parkside School is a private preparatory school located in Cobham. Founded in 1879, the school caters for boys aged 2 to 13 and for girls in the nursery school section aged 2 to 4.

History
Originally established in 1879 in East Horsely, Parkside moved to its current location on the banks of the River Mole in Stoke D'Abernon, Elmbridge in 1979. The school occupies 79 acres of land and contains a number of historic buildings.

It is situated in between Chelsea Football Club's training ground and the Yehudi Menuhin School.

Buildings

The Manor
The main building of the school is a Grade II* listed manor building, originally Elizabethan and then significantly modified in the Georgian era.

St Mary's Church
St Mary's Church, one of the oldest churches in Surrey, is found within the grounds of the school. It is a Grade I listed building.

Notable alumni
Notable alumni include Darryl Read (19 September 1951 – 23 June 2013), who was a British singer, guitarist, drummer, actor, poet and writer. In the late 1960s, Read was a member of Crushed Butler, considered by some to be amongst the forerunners of proto-punk and punk rock. He collaborated with musicians such as Bill Legend and Mickey Finn, both from Marc Bolan's T. Rex and The Doors' Ray Manzarek.

Also attending the school were Alexander Buller-Turner, Victor Buller-Turner and  Thomas Orde Lawder Wilkinson, each of whom were awarded the Victoria Cross.

Another former pupil, Stephen Lander, served as Director General of MI5 from 1996 to 2002. More recently, radio broadcaster Toby Tarrant and professional tennis players Alastair Gray and Jack Draper have attended the school.

References

Preparatory schools in Surrey
Borough of Elmbridge